Andre Badi Winner (born 9 November 1981) is a Grenadian-born English mixed martial artist. He was a cast member of Spike TV's The Ultimate Fighter: United States vs. United Kingdom, reaching the final. Winner is also a member of Team Rough House.

Mixed martial arts career

Early career
Winner was born in St. George's, Grenada to a white British father and an Afro-Caribbean mother, and moved to Leicester, United Kingdom at seven years old. Winner is one of three brothers and is the middle child. His older brother is William and his younger brother is named Michael. Michael is often in his corner during his fights and often assists in training. He started in sports during his high school years, competing in football and other athletics. Winner never thought of being a mixed martial artist but loved sports. He went to self-defense classes at Leicester Shootfighters and met Dan Hardy and Paul Daley. Hardy inspired Winner to give the sport a real try.

Winner tried out for the eighth season of the Ultimate Fighter. He did not make the cut but tried out for the ninth season and made the show.

The Ultimate Fighter
To get into The Ultimate Fighter house, Winner fought Gary Kelly. Winner won by knockout while working Kelly in the clinch. Winner then flew to Las Vegas to compete under coach Michael Bisping against the US team. He advanced to the semifinals of the lightweight tournament after defeating Santino Defranco by TKO in the first round. Winner then had his last fight on the show defeating Cameron Dollar by submission in round one. The win over Dollar put Winner in the finals to fight teammate, Ross Pearson.

Ultimate Fighting Championship
Winner fought Ross Pearson at The Ultimate Finale 9 in Las Vegas, Nevada. Winner lost by unanimous decision, along with losing the six-figure contract.

He defeated Rolando Delgado via first-round KO on 14 November 2009, at UFC 105.

Winner was scheduled to face Cole Miller on 31 March 2010 at UFC Fight Night 21. However, Miller was forced off the card after suffering an injury. Rafaello Oliveira was later confirmed as his replacement. Winner won via unanimous decision.

At UFC 118, Winner's fight was selected to be a part of the SpikeTV broadcast. He fought Nik Lentz, losing via unanimous decision after being out wrestled for all three rounds.

Winner then faced Dennis Siver on 13 November 2010 at UFC 122. He lost the fight via submission in the first round.

Winner lost to Anthony Njokuani on 2 July 2011 at UFC 132 via unanimous decision. Following the loss, Winner was released from the promotion.

BAMMA
Winner recently signed a contract with British promotion BAMMA. His first fight on was at BAMMA 7 against BAMMA veteran Jason Ball. Winner won the fight via unanimous decision.

Winner next competed in a Lightweight Title Eliminator bout against Diego Gonzalez at BAMMA 8. He again won via unanimous decision.

Winner next faced Rob Sinclair for the BAMMA Lightweight title at BAMMA 10, the first MMA event to be shown on Channel 5. Winner lost the fight via split decision.

All or Nothing 
On 3 May 2014 Winner fought in a 7-man tournament at All or Nothing 6. Winner won his quarter final fight via TKO against Jordan Miller before winning a decision victory against Stephen Martin. In the final, Winner defeated Artem Lobov via unanimous decision and therefore won the overall tournament.

KSW
At KSW 24, Winner challenged Mateusz Gamrot in a lightweight bout. He lost the fight via unanimous decision.

League S-70
Winner faced to Akop Stepanyan on 29 August 2015 at League S-70: Russia vs. World. He lost via unanimous decision.

Mixed martial arts record

|-
| Loss
| align=center|22–13–2
| Denis Kanakov
| Decision (unanimous)
| ACA 96: Goncharov vs. Johnson
| 
| align=center|3
| align=center|5:00
| Lodz, Poland
|  
|-
| Loss
| align=center| 22–12–2
| Yusup Raisov
| Decision (unanimous)
| |ACB 90 Moscow 
| 
| align=center|3
| align=center|5:00
| Moscow, Russia
|
|-
| Win
| align=center| 22–11–2
| Adam Aliev
| Submission (rear naked choke)
| |ACB 87: Whiteford vs Mousah 
| 
| align=center| 2
| align=center| 1:53
| Nottingham, England
|
|-
| Loss
| align=center| 21–11–2
| Saul Rogers
| Submission (D'arce choke)
| Tanko
| 
| align=center| 1
| align=center| 0:54
| Manchester, England
|
|-
| Win
| align=center| 21–10–2
| Abner Lloveras
| Decision (split)
| SHC 11
| 
| align=center| 3
| align=center| 5:00
| Geneva, Switzerland
|
|-
| Loss
| align=center| 20–10–2
| Leszek Krakowski
| Decision (unanimous)
| KSW 32: Road to Wembley
| 
| align=center| 3
| align=center| 5:00
| London, England
|
|-
| Loss
| align=center| 20–9–2
| Akop Stepanyan
| Decision (unanimous)
| League S-70: Russia vs. World
| 
| align=center| 3
| align=center| 5:00
| Sochi, Russia
|
|-
| Win 
| align=center| 20–8–2
| Colin Fletcher
| Decision (unanimous)
| BAMMA 20
| 
| align=center| 3
| align=center| 5:00
| Birmingham, England
|
|-
| Draw
| align=center| 19–8–2
| Xavier Sedras
| Draw (unanimous)
| Phoenix Fight Night 25
| 
| align=center| 3
| align=center| 5:00
| Bournemouth, Dorset, England
|
|-
| Win
| align=center| 19–8–1
| Artem Lobov
| Decision (unanimous)
| All or Nothing 6
| 
| align=center| 3
| align=center| 5:00
| Leeds, West Yorkshire, England
| 
|-
| Win
| align=center| 18–8–1
| Stephen Martin
| Decision (unanimous)
| All or Nothing 6
| 
| align=center| 3
| align=center| 5:00
| Leeds, West Yorkshire, England
| 
|-
| Win
| align=center| 17–8–1
| Jordan Miller
| TKO (punches)
| All or Nothing 6
| 
| align=center| 3
| align=center| 2:07
| Leeds, West Yorkshire, England
| 
|-
| Win
| align=center| 16–8–1
| Jeremy Petley
| Decision (unanimous)
| Europa MMA - Coga vs. Backstrom
| 
| align=center| 3
| align=center| 5:00
| Brentwood, Essex, England
| 
|-
| Loss
| align=center| 15–8–1
| Mateusz Gamrot
| Decision (unanimous)
| KSW 24
| 
| align=center| 3
| align=center| 5:00
| Lódz, Poland
| 
|-
| Win
| align=center| 15–7–1
| Drew Fickett
| Decision (unanimous)
| GWC – The British Invasion: US vs. UK
| 
| align=center| 3
| align=center| 5:00
| Kansas City, Missouri, United States
| 
|-
| Loss
| align=center| 14–7–1
| Rob Sinclair
| Decision (split)
| BAMMA 10
| 
| align=center| 5
| align=center| 5:00
| London, England
| 
|-
| Win
| align=center| 14–6–1
| Diego Gonzalez
| Decision (unanimous)
| BAMMA 8: Manuwa vs. Rea
| 
| align=center| 3
| align=center| 5:00
| Nottingham, England
| Lightweight Title Eliminator.
|-
| Win
| align=center| 13–6–1
| Jason Ball
| Decision (unanimous)
| BAMMA 7: Trigg vs. Wallhead
| 
| align=center| 3
| align=center| 5:00
| Birmingham, England
| 
|-
| Loss
| align=center| 12–6–1
| Anthony Njokuani
| Decision (unanimous)
| UFC 132
| 
| align=center| 3
| align=center| 5:00
| Las Vegas, Nevada, United States
| 
|-
| Loss
| align=center| 12–5–1
| Dennis Siver
| Submission (rear-naked choke)
| UFC 122
| 
| align=center| 1
| align=center| 3:37
| Oberhausen, Germany
| 
|-
| Loss
| align=center| 12–4–1
| Nik Lentz
| Decision (unanimous)
| UFC 118
| 
| align=center| 3
| align=center| 5:00
| Boston, Massachusetts, United States
| 
|-
| Win
| align=center| 12–3–1
| Rafaello Oliveira
| Decision (unanimous)
| UFC Fight Night: Florian vs. Gomi
| 
| align=center| 3
| align=center| 5:00
| Charlotte, North Carolina, United States
| 
|-
| Win
| align=center| 11–3–1
| Rolando Delgado
| KO (punch)
| UFC 105
| 
| align=center| 1
| align=center| 3:21
| Manchester, England
| 
|-
| Loss
| align=center| 10–3–1
| Ross Pearson
| Decision (unanimous)
| TUF 9 Finale
| 
| align=center| 3
| align=center| 5:00
| Las Vegas, Nevada, United States
| 
|-
| Draw
| align=center| 10–2–1
| Abdul Mohamed
| Draw
| Cage Warriors: Enter the Rough House 7
| 
| align=center| 3
| align=center| 5:00
| Nottingham, England
| 
|-
| Loss
| align=center| 10–2
| Bendy Casimir
| Decision (majority)
| Cage Warriors: Enter the Rough House 6
| 
| align=center| 3
| align=center| 5:00
| Nottingham, England
| 
|-
| Win
| align=center| 10–1
| Mario Stapel
| Decision (unanimous)
| FX3: England vs. Germany
| 
| align=center| 3
| align=center| 5:00
| Reading, England
| 
|-
| Win
| align=center| 9–1
| A.J. Wenn
| Decision (unanimous)
| CWFC: Enter The Rough House 4
| 
| align=center| 3
| align=center| 5:00
| Nottingham, England
| 
|-
| Win
| align=center| 8–1
| Daniel Thomas
| Decision (unanimous)
| CWFC: Enter The Rough House 3
| 
| align=center| 3
| align=center| 5:00
| Nottingham, England
| 
|-
| Win
| align=center| 7–1
| Aidan Marron
| Decision (unanimous)
| FX3: Fight Night 5
| 
| align=center| 3
| align=center| 5:00
| Reading, England
| 
|-
| Loss
| align=center| 6–1
| Greg Loughran
| Technical Submission (guillotine choke)
| CWFC: Enter The Rough House 2
| 
| align=center| 2
| align=center| 3:52
| Nottingham, England
| 
|-
| Win
| align=center| 6–0
| Wesley Felix
| Decision (split)
| FX3: Fight Night 4
| 
| align=center| 3
| align=center| 5:00
| Reading, England
| 
|-
| Win
| align=center| 5–0
| Sami Berik
| TKO (punches)
| Cage Rage Contenders 3
| 
| align=center| 3
| align=center| 1:50
| London, England
| 
|-
| Win
| align=center| 4–0
| Paul Cooper
| Submission (triangle choke)
| CWFC: Showdown
| 
| align=center| 2
| align=center| 1:50
| Sheffield, England
| 
|-
| Win
| align=center| 3–0
| Jeff Lawson
| Submission (eye injury)
| Cage Rage Contenders 2
| 
| align=center| 2
| align=center| 1:26
| Streatham, England
| 
|-
| Win
| align=center| 2–0
| Denas Banevicius
| TKO (submission to punches)
| FX3: Full Contact Fight Night 3
| 
| align=center| 1
| align=center| 2:21
| Bracknell, England
| 
|-
| Win
| align=center| 1–0
| Gareth Dummer
| KO (knees)
| HOP 1: Fight Night 1
| 
| align=center| 1
| align=center| N/A
| Swansea, England
|

References

External links
 
 
 Andre Winner official website
 Leicester Shootfighters website

1981 births
Living people
Sportspeople from Leicester
Grenadian emigrants to England
Grenadian people of British descent
Grenadian male karateka
Grenadian practitioners of Brazilian jiu-jitsu
Grenadian male mixed martial artists
English male karateka
Mixed martial artists utilizing Kyokushin kaikan
Mixed martial artists utilizing boxing
Mixed martial artists utilizing Brazilian jiu-jitsu
English male mixed martial artists
English practitioners of Brazilian jiu-jitsu
Lightweight mixed martial artists
Black British sportspeople
People from St. George's, Grenada
Ultimate Fighting Championship male fighters